Tram route 81 in Brussels, Belgium is a tram route in the south of the city which connects the Marius Renard stop in the municipality of Anderlecht with the multimodal Montgomery metro station in Woluwe-Saint-Pierre. The route also crosses the municipalities of Saint-Gilles, Ixelles, the City of Brussels and Etterbeek. It connects with the metro at Saint-Guidon/Sint Guido, Brussels South (also railway), Merode (also railway) and Montgomery. The route also crosses the major tram routes 3 and 4 at Horta. A good deal of its length is in carriageway, while long sections at either end are in reservation. It has a short section in tunnel at South Station.

The route was changed in the 2000s, with the section west from Brussels-South railway station going to Marius Renard rather than Heysel/Heizel.

Until 2018 the route was served by PCC trams - first 7700-series and later the longer 7900s. In that year the stops at Bailli/Baljuw were moved from the central reservation of Avenue Louise/Louizalaan into Rue du Bailli/Baljuwstraat, which has permitted the longer Flexity low-floor trams to be used when these are not needed elsewhere, that is normally at weekends. This progression to high-capacity vehicles accompanies an improvement in service frequency, with the daytime headway now being 71/2 minutes.

Route
Montgomery - Merode - Sint-Pietersplein/Place St Pierre - Acacia/Acacias - De Jacht/La Chasse - Sint-Antoonkerk/Église Saint-Antoine - Mouterij/Germoir - Gist/Levure - Flagey - Dautzenberg - Baljuw/Baili - Drievuldigheid/Trinité - Janson - Moris - Lombardije/Lombardie - Bareel/Barrière - Willem Tell/Guillaume Tell - Bethlehem/Bethléem - Koningslaan/Avenue du Roi - Zweden/Suède - Zuidstation/Gare du Midi - Bara - Raad/Conseil - Albert I - Kuregem/Curegham - Dover/Douvres - Verzet/Résistance - Sint-Guido/Saint-Guidon - Meir - Ysaye - van Beethoven - Frans Hals - Vivèspark/Parc Vivès - Marius Renard.

See also
List of Brussels tram routes

References

External links
STIB/MIVB Website

81
Anderlecht
City of Brussels
Etterbeek
Ixelles
Saint-Gilles, Belgium
Woluwe-Saint-Pierre